Kaburu is a Swedish free improvisation duo that was formed in 2004 by the multi-instrumentalist Thomas Toivonen and the percussionist/actor Iggy Malmborg. According to them, 'Kaburu is a direct (re)action on the world that surrounds them and their musical expression is an attempt to go beyond the confinements of civilized behavior'. They are both outspoken critiques of civilization. 

Their main musical influences are free jazz, the European free improvisation scene, noise and post-hardcore. They have made one official release on the Swedish internet label Hwem. 

The music of Kaburu have been played on Anarchy Radio  with John Zerzan in Eugene, Oregon.

External links 
Kaburu
 Official website

Experimental musical groups